Fernsplatt is a hamlet  east of Redruth in Cornwall, England.

References

Hamlets in Cornwall